Global Baba is a Bollywood film based on spiritual babas of India. India can arguably be named the land of the babas, with thousands of devotees blindly surrendering themselves to godmen. The idea behind Global Baba is to expose such babas is in the offing. Abhimanyu Singh plays a godman in the movie.

Some scenes of the film were shot in Daman and Diu.

Cast and crew
 Abhimanyu Singh as Chillam Pehlwaan/ Global Baba
 Pankaj Tripathi as Damru
 Ravi Kishan as Jacob
 Sandeepa Dhar as Bhavana Sharma
 Akhilendra Mishra as Dallu Yadav
 Sanjay Mishra as Bhola Pandit
 Khesari Lal Yadav, cameo in the song "Holi me ude"

Soundtrack

Critical reception
The Hindu called it "a film that might be loud but does talk sense."

References

Further reading

External links
 

2016 films
2010s Hindi-language films
Films about religion
Films shot in Daman and Diu